Poinsett County is a county located in the U.S. state of Arkansas. As of the 2020 census, the population was 22,965. The county seat is Harrisburg.

Poinsett County is included in the Jonesboro–Paragould Combined Statistical Area.

History

Poinsett County was formed on February 28, 1838, and named for Joel Roberts Poinsett, U.S. Secretary of War. County business was initially conducted in the county judge's home until first court was held in Bolivar, upon completion of a courthouse in 1839. County government was moved in 1859 to Harrisburg, a more central locale designated as the new county seat. Poinsett County acquired its current boundaries in the years following this change, as portions were assigned to newly organized counties.

The northern portion became Craighead County, and the south portion became Cross County. Sunken lands were added to eastern Poinsett County during this time, including Lepanto and Marked Tree.

The Civil War devastated the county financially. It did not recover until the railroads were constructed into the area, giving farmers a new avenue to market their crops, and the timber industry developed. The Texas and St. Louis Railway Company completed track through Weiner and the St. Louis and Iron Mountain Railway ran through the center of the county in 1882. The Kansas City, Ft. Scott, and Gulf Railroad opened service in east Poinsett County the following year. Shipping timber had become feasible and was undertaken throughout northeast Arkansas following the completion of railroads. Farmers used the railroads to ship their cotton and farm animals to new markets. Many small railroad towns boomed during this period. Despite this uplift, the county's population mostly consisted of poor sharecroppers and tenant farmers, with an elite class of white landowners.

Poinsett County was the hardest hit county by the Great Mississippi Flood of 1927, which flooded thousands of fields and destroyed homes countywide. The Southern Tenant Farmers Union was founded in 1935 in Tyronza during the Great Depression. The organization was an interracial union to improve the pay and working conditions of poor sharecroppers. It met violent resistance from white planters, with union leaders and members attacked and some killed throughout its areas of organizing in Arkansas and Mississippi. The Southern Tenant Farmers Union Museum in Tyronza is operated by Arkansas State University.

Geography

Located in Arkansas's northeast corner, the county is bisected by Crowley's Ridge and the L'Anguille River which both pass north–south through the county. The soils in the eastern part of the county have been deposited by the Mississippi River and are mostly used for cotton farming. Western Poinsett County is generally dedicated to rice fields. Lake Poinsett State Park is centrally located within the county.

Major highways

 Interstate 555
 U.S. Highway 49
 U.S. Highway 63
 Highway 1
 Highway 14
 Highway 18
 Highway 69
 Highway 75
 Highway 118
 Highway 135
 Highway 136
 Highway 140
 Highway 149
 Highway 158
 Highway 163
 Highway 198
 Highway 214
 Highway 308
 Highway 322
 Highway 373
 Highway 463

Adjacent counties
Craighead County (north)
Mississippi County (east)
Crittenden County (southeast)
Cross County (south)
Jackson County (west)

Demographics

2020 census

As of the 2020 United States census, there were 22,965 people, 9,526 households, and 6,710 families residing in the county.

2000 census
As of the 2000 census, there were 25,614 people, 10,026 households, and 7,228 families residing in the county. There were 11,051 housing units at an average density of 15 per square mile (6/km2). The racial makeup of the county was 90.98% White, 7.13% Black or African American, 0.23% Native American, 0.16% Asian, 0.02% Pacific Islander, 0.74% from other races, and 0.75% from two or more races.  1.43% of the population were Hispanic or Latino of any race.

There were 10,026 households, out of which 32.60% had children under the age of 18 living with them, 54.60% were married couples living together, 13.20% had a female householder with no husband present, and 27.90% were non-families. 24.80% of all households were made up of individuals, and 11.70% had someone living alone who was 65 years of age or older.  The average household size was 2.52 and the average family size was 2.99.

In the county, the population was spread out, with 26.10% under the age of 18, 8.90% from 18 to 24, 27.10% from 25 to 44, 23.70% from 45 to 64, and 14.30% who were 65 years of age or older.  The median age was 37 years. For every 100 females, there were 94.60 males.  For every 100 females age 18 and over, there were 90.30 males.

The median income for a household in the county was $26,558, and the median income for a family was $32,257. Males had a median income of $26,633 versus $19,199 for females. The per capita income for the county was $13,087.  About 17.60% of families and 21.20% of the population were below the poverty line, including 28.60% of those under age 18 and 20.50% of those age 65 or over.

Government
Poinsett County generally voted Democratic until, in 2008, it voted Republican for only the third time in the past century; in the four elections since then it has also gone Republican.

Education

Public education
Early childhood, elementary and secondary education is available from four school districts listed from largest to smallest based on student population:

 Trumann School District based in Trumann with four facilities serving more than 1,600 students.
 Harrisburg School District based in Harrisburg with five facilities and serving more than 1,300 students.
 East Poinsett County School District based in Lepanto with three facilities serving more than 750 students.
 Marked Tree School District based in Marked Tree with three facilities serving more than 650 students.

Libraries
Poinsett County is served with central and branch libraries from two library systems, the Crowley Ridge Regional Library System and Trumann Library System.

Communities

Cities
Fisher
Harrisburg (county seat)
Lepanto
Marked Tree
Trumann
Tyronza
Weiner

Town
Waldenburg

Census-designated place
 Payneway
 Rivervale

Unincorporated communities
Greenfield

Townships

 Boliver (Harrisburg)
 Dobson
 Greenfield
 Greenwood (Lepanto)
 Little River (Marked Tree)
 Lunsford
 Owen (Fisher, Waldenburg)
 Scott
 Tyronza (Tyronza)
 West Prairie (Weiner)
 Willis (Trumann)

See also
 Arkansas Highway 308 (1973–1979), former state highway southwest of Marked Tree
 List of lakes in Poinsett County, Arkansas
 National Register of Historic Places listings in Poinsett County, Arkansas

References

External links
 Poinsett County, Arkansas entry on the Encyclopedia of Arkansas History & Culture

 
1838 establishments in Arkansas
Populated places established in 1838
Jonesboro metropolitan area
Jonesboro-Paragould Combined Statistical Area